Jared Nathaniel Emerson-Johnson (born October 13, 1981) is an American video game music composer, sound designer, voice director and voice actor. Emerson-Johnson is the Music Supervisor and lead composer at Bay Area Sound, an audio production company specializing in sound design, music and voiceover for video games.

Career

Jared began his career as an assistant to composer Clint Bajakian on the score for LucasArts' Indiana Jones and the Emperor's Tomb. Emerson-Johnson has also worked as a sound designer for projects, including James Bond 007: Everything or Nothing, The Lord of the Rings: The Return of the King, Psychonauts, and Firewatch. Emerson-Johnson is perhaps best known as the composer behind multiple video games produced by Telltale Games, such as Bone, Sam & Max, Strong Bad's Cool Game for Attractive People, Wallace & Gromit's Grand Adventures, Poker Night at the Inventory, Back to the Future: The Game, Jurassic Park: The Game, The Walking Dead, The Wolf Among Us, Game of Thrones, Batman: The Telltale Series, and Guardians of the Galaxy: The Telltale Series.

In all three seasons of Sam & Max, he voices the C.O.P.S., a group of obsolete computers. In Tales of Monkey Island, he plays the Marquis DeSinge as well as the Thief.

In 2004, Emerson-Johnson received the Game Audio Network Guild's "Rookie of the Year" award. Jared's score, voice direction, and sound design for Telltale Games' Bone: The Great Cow Race were finalists for the 2007 Independent Games Festival. His score for Telltale Games' Sam & Max Beyond Time and Space was also a finalist for Best Original Score in the 2008 IGN PC Awards. He shares an AdventureGamers.com 2009 Aggie award for best voice acting for his work on Tales of Monkey Island.

His score for Telltale Games’ The Walking Dead was nominated for Best Music of the year at the British Academy Games Awards in 2013.

Discography

Video game soundtracks
The Bard's Tale (2004)
Bone: Out from Boneville (2005)
America's Army: Rise of a Soldier (2005)
Bone: The Great Cow Race (2006)
Sam & Max Save the World (2006–2007)
Alien Syndrome (2007)
Sam & Max Beyond Time and Space (2007–2008)
Strong Bad's Cool Game for Attractive People (2008)
Wallace & Gromit's Grand Adventures (2009)
Sam & Max: The Devil's Playhouse (2010)
Nelson Tethers: Puzzle Agent (2010)
Poker Night at the Inventory (2010)
Back to the Future: The Game (2010-2011)
Puzzle Agent 2 (2011)
Jurassic Park: The Game (2011)
Double Fine Happy Action Theater (2012)
The Walking Dead (2012)
Poker Night 2 (2013)
The Wolf Among Us (2013)
The Walking Dead: Season Two (2013)
Tales from the Borderlands (2014)
Game of Thrones (video game) (2014)
The Walking Dead: Michonne (2016)
Batman: The Telltale Series (2016)
The Walking Dead: A New Frontier (2017)
Batman: The Enemy Within (2017)
Guardians of the Galaxy: The Telltale Series (2017)
The Walking Dead: The Final Season (2018)
Nick Bounty and the Dame with the Blue Chewed Shoe (2020)
Sam & Max Save the World Remastered (2020)
Sam & Max: This Time It's Virtual (2021)
I Expect You To Die 2: The Spy And The Liar (2021)
Sam & Max Beyond Time and Space Remastered (2021)
The Wolf Among Us 2 (2024)

Other works
Mr. Lux At Your Service (2008)
YouTube Presents: The Birds and the Biz (2008)

Notes

BAFTA Games Awards

Golden Joystick Awards

Game Audio Network Guild Awards

Independent Games Festival

Golden Joystick Awards

Jug Band

In addition to his work in entertainment music scoring, Jared is also the front man of the Rivertown Skifflers, a northern California based jug band.

References

External links
 Official Site
 Jared Emerson-Johnson at Bay Area Sound, Inc
 
 Jared Emerson-Johnson at MobyGames
 Jared Emerson-Johnson at Giant Bomb

1981 births
Living people
American sound designers
American voice directors
Place of birth missing (living people)
Video game composers
Male actors from San Francisco
American male voice actors